The Novomoskovsk constituency (No.184) is a Russian legislative constituency in Tula Oblast. Until 2007 the constituency covered northern Tula Oblast, however, in 2016 it grabbed half of Tula from the Tula constituency.

Members elected

Election results

1993

|-
! colspan=2 style="background-color:#E9E9E9;text-align:left;vertical-align:top;" |Candidate
! style="background-color:#E9E9E9;text-align:left;vertical-align:top;" |Party
! style="background-color:#E9E9E9;text-align:right;" |Votes
! style="background-color:#E9E9E9;text-align:right;" |%
|-
|style="background-color:"|
|align=left|Vladimir Vasilyov
|align=left|Independent
|
|11.71%
|-
|style="background-color:"|
|align=left|Vladimir Zagorodnikov
|align=left|Independent
| -
|8.38%
|-
| colspan="5" style="background-color:#E9E9E9;"|
|- style="font-weight:bold"
| colspan="3" style="text-align:left;" | Total
| 
| 100%
|-
| colspan="5" style="background-color:#E9E9E9;"|
|- style="font-weight:bold"
| colspan="4" |Source:
|
|}

1995

|-
! colspan=2 style="background-color:#E9E9E9;text-align:left;vertical-align:top;" |Candidate
! style="background-color:#E9E9E9;text-align:left;vertical-align:top;" |Party
! style="background-color:#E9E9E9;text-align:right;" |Votes
! style="background-color:#E9E9E9;text-align:right;" |%
|-
|style="background-color:#E98282"|
|align=left|Zhanna Lozinskaya
|align=left|Women of Russia
|
|16.23%
|-
|style="background-color:"|
|align=left|Stanislav Shedenkov
|align=left|Our Home – Russia
|
|15.87%
|-
|style="background-color:"|
|align=left|Viktor Krutilin
|align=left|Independent
|
|12.15%
|-
|style="background-color:#D50000"|
|align=left|Vyacheslav Reguzov
|align=left|Communists and Working Russia - for the Soviet Union
|
|9.87%
|-
|style="background-color:"|
|align=left|Aleksey Umnov
|align=left|Liberal Democratic Party
|
|8.57%
|-
|style="background-color:#1C1A0D"|
|align=left|Aleksandr Berestnev
|align=left|Forward, Russia!
|
|5.26%
|-
|style="background-color:#DA2021"|
|align=left|Vladimir Vasilyov (incumbent)
|align=left|Ivan Rybkin Bloc
|
|5.09%
|-
|style="background-color:#FE4801"|
|align=left|Nikolay Polishchuk
|align=left|Pamfilova–Gurov–Lysenko
|
|4.80%
|-
|style="background-color:#0D0900"|
|align=left|Vladislav Kartoshkin
|align=left|People's Union
|
|3.23%
|-
|style="background-color:#A8A821"|
|align=left|Sergey Petrushin
|align=left|Stable Russia
|
|2.40%
|-
|style="background-color:"|
|align=left|Valery Bogatov
|align=left|Union of Patriots
|
|2.00%
|-
|style="background-color:#000000"|
|colspan=2 |against all
|
|11.99%
|-
| colspan="5" style="background-color:#E9E9E9;"|
|- style="font-weight:bold"
| colspan="3" style="text-align:left;" | Total
| 
| 100%
|-
| colspan="5" style="background-color:#E9E9E9;"|
|- style="font-weight:bold"
| colspan="4" |Source:
|
|}

1999

|-
! colspan=2 style="background-color:#E9E9E9;text-align:left;vertical-align:top;" |Candidate
! style="background-color:#E9E9E9;text-align:left;vertical-align:top;" |Party
! style="background-color:#E9E9E9;text-align:right;" |Votes
! style="background-color:#E9E9E9;text-align:right;" |%
|-
|style="background-color:"|
|align=left|Anatoly Artemyev
|align=left|Communist Party
|
|23.95%
|-
|style="background:#1042A5"| 
|align=left|Aleksandr Berestnev
|align=left|Union of Right Forces
|
|6.47%
|-
|style="background:#E98282"| 
|align=left|Zhanna Lozinskaya (incumbent)
|align=left|Women of Russia
|
|6.18%
|-
|style="background-color:"|
|align=left|Aleksandr Ivanenko
|align=left|Independent
|
|5.77%
|-
|style="background-color:"|
|align=left|Viktor Lebedinets
|align=left|Independent
|
|5.44%
|-
|style="background-color:"|
|align=left|Stanislav Shedenkov
|align=left|Unity
|
|5.31%
|-
|style="background-color:"|
|align=left|Vladimir Karpinsky
|align=left|Independent
|
|5.19%
|-
|style="background-color:"|
|align=left|Pyotr Kazachenko
|align=left|Independent
|
|5.01%
|-
|style="background-color:"|
|align=left|Yevgeny Mikheyev
|align=left|Independent
|
|4.08%
|-
|style="background-color:"|
|align=left|Oleg Khudyakov
|align=left|Independent
|
|3.56%
|-
|style="background-color:"|
|align=left|Vyacheslav Reguzov
|align=left|Independent
|
|3.18%
|-
|style="background-color:#C62B55"|
|align=left|Yury Gorbunov
|align=left|Peace, Labour, May
|
|2.56%
|-
|style="background-color:"|
|align=left|Aleksandr Shkolny
|align=left|Liberal Democratic Party
|
|2.39%
|-
|style="background-color:"|
|align=left|Valery Khrustalev
|align=left|Our Home – Russia
|
|1.09%
|-
|style="background-color:"|
|align=left|Anatoly Siryukin
|align=left|Independent
|
|0.58%
|-
|style="background-color:#020266"|
|align=left|Valery Frozen
|align=left|Russian Socialist Party
|
|0.31%
|-
|style="background-color:"|
|align=left|Vladimir Inyagin
|align=left|Independent
|
|0.25%
|-
|style="background-color:#000000"|
|colspan=2 |against all
|
|15.93%
|-
| colspan="5" style="background-color:#E9E9E9;"|
|- style="font-weight:bold"
| colspan="3" style="text-align:left;" | Total
| 
| 100%
|-
| colspan="5" style="background-color:#E9E9E9;"|
|- style="font-weight:bold"
| colspan="4" |Source:
|
|}

2003

|-
! colspan=2 style="background-color:#E9E9E9;text-align:left;vertical-align:top;" |Candidate
! style="background-color:#E9E9E9;text-align:left;vertical-align:top;" |Party
! style="background-color:#E9E9E9;text-align:right;" |Votes
! style="background-color:#E9E9E9;text-align:right;" |%
|-
|style="background-color:"|
|align=left|Dmitry Savelyev
|align=left|Rodina
|
|23.11%
|-
|style="background-color:"|
|align=left|Anatoly Artemyev (incumbent)
|align=left|Communist Party
|
|21.12%
|-
|style="background-color:"|
|align=left|Yevgeny Mikheyev
|align=left|United Russia
|
|20.20%
|-
|style="background-color:"|
|align=left|Aleksey Popov
|align=left|Independent
|
|4.62%
|-
|style="background-color:"|
|align=left|Igor Ivantsov
|align=left|Independent
|
|4.15%
|-
|style="background-color:"|
|align=left|Aleksey Umnov
|align=left|Liberal Democratic Party
|
|3.95%
|-
|style="background-color:#FFD700"|
|align=left|Mikhail Ivantsov
|align=left|People's Party
|
|2.79%
|-
|style="background-color:#004090"|
|align=left|Aleksandr Berestnev
|align=left|New Course — Automobile Russia
|
|2.09%
|-
|style="background-color:#164C8C"|
|align=left|Nikolay Miroshnik
|align=left|United Russian Party Rus'
|
|0.62%
|-
|style="background-color:#000000"|
|colspan=2 |against all
|
|15.25%
|-
| colspan="5" style="background-color:#E9E9E9;"|
|- style="font-weight:bold"
| colspan="3" style="text-align:left;" | Total
| 
| 100%
|-
| colspan="5" style="background-color:#E9E9E9;"|
|- style="font-weight:bold"
| colspan="4" |Source:
|
|}

2016

|-
! colspan=2 style="background-color:#E9E9E9;text-align:left;vertical-align:top;" |Candidate
! style="background-color:#E9E9E9;text-align:left;vertical-align:top;" |Party
! style="background-color:#E9E9E9;text-align:right;" |Votes
! style="background-color:#E9E9E9;text-align:right;" |%
|-
|style="background-color: " |
|align=left|Vladimir Afonsky
|align=left|United Russia
|
|51.60%
|-
|style="background-color:"|
|align=left|Oleg Lebedev
|align=left|Communist Party
|
|15.06%
|-
|style="background-color:"|
|align=left|Aleksandr Balberov
|align=left|Liberal Democratic Party
|
|9.53%
|-
|style="background-color:"|
|align=left|Sergey Grebenshchikov
|align=left|A Just Russia
|
|6.55%
|-
|style="background:"| 
|align=left|Ildar Abdulganiyev
|align=left|Communists of Russia
|
|2.87%
|-
|style="background-color:"|
|align=left|Aleksey Novgorodov
|align=left|Rodina
|
|2.85%
|-
|style="background:"| 
|align=left|Anastasia Zhukova
|align=left|Party of Growth
|
|2.49%
|-
|style="background:"| 
|align=left|Yelena Konovalova
|align=left|Yabloko
|
|2.21%
|-
|style="background:"| 
|align=left|Roman Yefremov
|align=left|People's Freedom Party
|
|1.74%
|-
|style="background-color:"|
|align=left|Mikhail Seregin
|align=left|The Greens
|
|1.25%
|-
| colspan="5" style="background-color:#E9E9E9;"|
|- style="font-weight:bold"
| colspan="3" style="text-align:left;" | Total
| 
| 100%
|-
| colspan="5" style="background-color:#E9E9E9;"|
|- style="font-weight:bold"
| colspan="4" |Source:
|
|}

2021

|-
! colspan=2 style="background-color:#E9E9E9;text-align:left;vertical-align:top;" |Candidate
! style="background-color:#E9E9E9;text-align:left;vertical-align:top;" |Party
! style="background-color:#E9E9E9;text-align:right;" |Votes
! style="background-color:#E9E9E9;text-align:right;" |%
|-
|style="background-color: " |
|align=left|Nadezhda Shkolkina
|align=left|United Russia
|
|47.29%
|-
|style="background-color:"|
|align=left|Vladimir Isakov
|align=left|Communist Party
|
|13.74%
|-
|style="background-color:"|
|align=left|Sergey Grebenshchikov
|align=left|A Just Russia — For Truth
|
|10.06%
|-
|style="background:"| 
|align=left|Denis Ilyukhin
|align=left|Communists of Russia
|
|5.29%
|-
|style="background-color: " |
|align=left|Maksim Tokayev
|align=left|New People
|
|4.91%
|-
|style="background-color: "|
|align=left|Nikolay Ogoltsov
|align=left|Party of Pensioners
|
|4.56%
|-
|style="background-color:"|
|align=left|Aleksandr Marinkov
|align=left|Liberal Democratic Party
|
|3.80%
|-
|style="background: "| 
|align=left|Yulia Morozova
|align=left|Yabloko
|
|2.52%
|-
|style="background-color:"|
|align=left|Dmitry Shatrov
|align=left|Rodina
|
|1.89%
|-
|style="background-color:"|
|align=left|Aleksey Makoseyev
|align=left|The Greens
|
|1.87%
|-
| colspan="5" style="background-color:#E9E9E9;"|
|- style="font-weight:bold"
| colspan="3" style="text-align:left;" | Total
| 
| 100%
|-
| colspan="5" style="background-color:#E9E9E9;"|
|- style="font-weight:bold"
| colspan="4" |Source:
|
|}

Notes

References

Russian legislative constituencies
Politics of Tula Oblast